Alfano is an Italian surname. Notable people with the surname include:

Angelino Alfano (born 1970), Italian politician
Enrico Alfano (1869 or 1870-unknown), Italian mobster
Franco Alfano (1875–1954), Italian composer
Graciela Alfano (born 1952), Argentine model
Joann Alfano, American television producer
Robert Alfano, American physicist
Thomas Alfano (born 1959), American politician
Vanessa Alfano (born 1976), American television journalist
Vincenzo Alfano (1850-), Italian sculptor

Italian-language surnames

de:Alfano
it:Alfano (disambigua)
nl:Alfano